Martin Luther Academy (MLA) is a private Lutheran elementary school in Kansas City, Missouri. The school is located at 7112 N Overland Dr., Kansas City, Missouri, 64151.

MLA is a member of the Northland Lutheran Schools Association. It is accredited by the National Lutheran Schools Accreditation and Missouri Non-Public Schools.

External links
Martin Luther Academy

Schools in Kansas City, Missouri

Lutheran schools in Missouri
Schools affiliated with the Lutheran Church–Missouri Synod